Kerry Jason Beaumont (born 5 April 1957) is a British organist and choir director.

Early life and training
Born in Cambridge, England, Beaumont emigrated to Canada with his family 1970.

His musical education included studies in organ improvisation with Antoine Reboulot in Quebec, Canada, and with Pierre Cochereau in Nice, France, and he has since pursued an active interest in the art of improvisation in his concert career.

Career
Beaumont was Director of Music at the Church of the Good Samaritan in Paoli, Pennsylvania, United States, for seven years (1981-1988) before returning to the United Kingdom.

He then served as Organist and Master of the Choristers at St Davids Cathedral in Wales from 1990 to 1994 and at Ripon Cathedral in England from 1994 to 2002 before being appointed Director of Music at Coventry Cathedral, a position he held from 2006 to 2020. Upon his retirement from Coventry he was made Organist Emeritus of the Cathedral, and the following year he was awarded the Cranmer Award for Worship by the Archbishop of Canterbury for his "outstanding service to music and worship ..., with particular reference at Coventry to outreach, recruitment and nurture of boy and girl choristers to create a cathedral choir with diversity at its heart".

In 2021 he was appointed Director of Music at Holy Trinity Church in Leamington Spa.

Recordings and concert performances
Beaumont's recordings as an organist and choirmaster are published by Priory Records, Herald AV Productions and Cantoris Records. As a member of SOCAN (the Society of Canadian Composers, Authors and Publishers) he has published several hundred recorded compositions through the programme music libraries of Omnimusic and the Parry Music Library. Of his church music there are published titles by Encore Publications and Banks Music Publications.

References

1957 births
Living people
Cathedral organists
British classical organists
British male organists
People from Paoli, Pennsylvania
21st-century organists
21st-century British male musicians
Male classical organists